Yellow River Conservancy Commission (YRCC) is a government agency of Ministry of Water Resources of the People's Republic of China. YRCC takes responsibility of water administration of the Yellow River basin and the inland river basins in such province as Xinjiang, Qinghai, Gansu and Inner Mongolia.

Organization

Headquarters
Office of Administration, YRCC 
Office of the Chief Engineer, YRCC 
Department of Planning and Programming, YRCC 
Department of Water Policy, YRCC (Water-policy Supervising Team) 
Department of Water Resources Management and Regulation, YRCC 
Department of Financial Affairs, YRCC 
Department of Personnel, Labour and Education, YRCC 
Department of International Cooperation, Science and Technology, YRCC 
Department of Construction and Management, YRCC (Yellow River Basin Branch, Water Project Quality Control Station of the Ministry of Water Resources) 
Department of Water and Soil Conservation, YRCC 
The Office of Flood Control, YRCC 
Department of Supervision, YRCC 
Department of Auditing, YRCC 
Department of Retirement Administration, YRCC 
Chinese Communist Committee, YRCC 
Yellow River Committee of Agricultural, Forestry and Water Conservancy Workers Union of China

Additional Unit 
Yellow River Basin Water Resources Protection Bureau of the Ministry of Water Resources and Ministry of Environmental Protection

Institutional Units 
Yellow River Shandong Bureau, YRCC 
Yellow River Henan Bureau, YRCC 
Upper and Middle Yellow River Bureau, YRCC 
Heihe River Bureau, YRCC 
Hydrological Bureau, YRCC 
Economic Development and Management Bureau, YRCC 
Yellow River Institute of Hydraulic Research, YRCC 
Resettlement Bureau, YRCC 
Yellow River Administrative Service Centre, YRCC 
Yellow River Central Hospital, YRCC 
Press and Publication Center, YRCC 
Information Center, YRCC 
Yellow River Xiaobeiganliu Shanxi Bureau, YRCC 
Yellow River Xiaobeiganliu Shaanxi Bureau, YRCC

Corporations 
Institute of Hydraulic Survey, Programming and Designing, YRCC 
Yellow River Mingzhu (Holding) Co. Ltd. (Management Bureau of Sanmenxia Multipurpose Project)

External links
 The official website of Yellow River Conservancy Commission

Water resource management in China